Mary Kimball Morgan (8 December 1861 – 13 October 1948) was an American educator and the founder of The Principia, a K–12 school in St. Louis, Missouri, and Principia College, a four year college in Elsah, Illinois.

Biography
Nellie May Kimball, who went by Mary, was born in Janesville, Wisconsin on December 8, 1861. Her family moved to St. Louis when she was six years old, where she went to school and was active in the Methodist Church. She planned on attending college but was prevented by health issues. She married William Edgar Morgan in December of 1885, but her health continued to decline rapidly. She joined the Christian Science Church in St. Louis and in 1896 became a practitioner.

She began homeschooling her two sons, and soon was asked by other parents at her church to teach their children as well. She opened a home school in October 1898, hiring an assistant to teach the older children, and teaching the younger ones herself. Morgan called her school The Principia. In 1910 she added a two-year college, one of the first in America, which expanded to a four year college in 1932.

Kimball served as president of the school and college until 1937 when her son Frederic took over and she was named president emeritus. She died 13 October 1948.

References

Further reading
Edwin S. Leonard Jr. (1948). As the Sowing: The First Fifty Years of The Principia.

1861 births
1948 deaths
20th-century women educators
American women educators
Principia College faculty
Principia School faculty
American Christian Scientists
People from Janesville, Wisconsin
University and college founders
Founders of schools in the United States